This is a list of the preserved important buildings in Puebla de Zaragoza, city of Mexico. During the colony called Puebla de los Angeles.

Puebla de los Angeles enjoyed extraordinary prosperity from the beginning of the 17th century until the last days of Spanish rule. Agricultural producers, tanneries, cotton and wool looms, and the pottery and glass industry were their main sources of wealth. There were merchants and artisans who amassed great fortunes. The desire for luxury and the love of ostentation found their best expression in the artistic monuments of the city.

During the Spanish colony, Puebla was well known for its fine ceramics, especially for the style that would be called Talavera pottery.

The "Historic Centre of Puebla" is a UNESCO World Heritage Site since 1987.

Colonial

References

 
Puebla

Architecture in Mexico
Mexico
Mexico